Maud Molyneux (27 March 1948 – 16 September 2008) was a French actress and costume designer.

Filmography

Actress  
1976: Tam Tam d'Adolfo Arrieta
 1976 : Mélodrame de Jean-Louis Jorge : Anna
 1981 : Cinématon #119 de Gérard Courant : elle-même
 1985 : La Nuit porte-jarretelles de Virginie Thévenet
 1987 : Jeux d'artifices de Virginie Thévenet :  Duval

Costumer 
 1999 : La Dilettante de Pascal Thomas
 2001 : Mercredi, folle journée ! de Pascal Thomas
 2004 : Quand je serai star de Patrick Mimouni
 2005 : Mon petit doigt m'a dit... de Pascal Thomas
 2006 : Le Grand Appartement de Pascal Thomas
 2008 : Je vous hais petites filles (court métrage) de Yann Gonzalez

References

External links
 Maud Molyneux

2008 deaths
1948 births
French actresses
French costume designers